The SsangYong Actyon  (Korean: 쌍용 액티언) is a compact SUV built by the South Korean automobile manufacturer SsangYong Motor from 2005 to 2011 for the first generation, and 2012 to 2018 for the second. It was available either as an SUV (Actyon) or as a pick-up truck (Actyon Sports). They replaced the SsangYong Musso and Musso Sports. The name is an amalgam of the words "action" and "young".

Overview 
Both are available 2WD or 4WD systems and a third generation common rail VGT turbo diesel engine, or a 2.3 litre overhead cam four cylinder petrol engine.

The vehicle also comes with a double wishbone front suspension and a five-link rear end in addition to ESP (Electronic Stability Program). Along with ESP, the Actyon also comes with hill descent control as standard (on some models).

Other optional equipment includes keyless entry, dual airbags, speed sensitive central locking, engine immobilizer and alarm, electric windows, child safety door locks and tray liner. Initially offered with a four speed automatic, the Actyon was later upgraded with a six speed automatic transmission sourced from Australian company Drivetrain Systems International. 

For a few years, there was no Australian importer for SsangYong so the supply contract for the automatic transmissions disappeared, and Drivetrain Systems International went into receivership, eventually being bought out by conglomerate Geely, where then all manufacturing was moved to China.After a number of issues with the six speed automatic transmissions, SsangYong reverted to a five speed automatic transmission for the automatic Actyon Sports. In 2008, 

Phoenix Motorcars in Ontario, California introduced the electrically powered Phoenix SUV and Phoenix SUT for fleet managers, both based on the chassis of the original Actyon and Actyon Sports. In June 2010, the Actyon received a facelift. In April 2018, Ssangyong declared the discontinuation of the Actyon after poor sales.

Actyon Sports 
A year into Actyon production, a pickup variant was announced, called the Actyon Sports. This variant outlasted its namesake, in production until 2018 with the release of the new Musso pickup. Replacing the original Musso Sports, the Actyon Sports has a wider track, increased load capacity and a more fuel efficient European designed engine.

Redesign 
In 2012, SsangYong launched an updated version of the Actyon Sports pickup, which in the market of Korea is called Korando Sports, which is essentially a production version of the SUT–1 Concept Car, as seen in the 2011 Geneva Motor Show. They also launched a facelifted Actyon SUV called the SsangYong Nomad in 2014, but it was mainly sold in Kazakhstan until 2017.

Motorsport 
SsangYong New Zealand launched an Actyon Racing series in 2014. The series features a field of slightly modified Actyons with identical drive trains, allowing driver ability to determine race outcomes. The racing Actyons featured a 2.3 litre petrol engine by Mercedes-Benz mated to a locally sourced four speed sequential gearbox and an open differential. The suspension was lowered to improve handling and a full protective rollcage and harnesses were installed.

Gallery

References

External links 

Actyon
Pickup trucks
All-wheel-drive vehicles
Compact sport utility vehicles
Crossover sport utility vehicles
Sport utility trucks
Cars introduced in 2005
2010s cars